The cachua (qachwa, kashua, kaswa, kachura) ( or , diminutive form cachuita) is a term from Quechua language qhachwa, meaning "round dance," that is the Spanish name for a Latin-American baroque dance form found mainly in Peru. It still exists today as a circle dance. The term was also applied to some villancicos to Spanish texts with cachua rhythm, such as two examples in a report submitted to Charles IV of Spain c.1788-1790. It is in rapid unsyncopated 2/4 time.

References

Peruvian dances
Circle dances